Elizabeth Kristine "Elli" Ochowicz (born December 15, 1983) is an Olympic speed skater who has competed in the three Winter Olympics.

Ochowicz was born in Waukesha, Wisconsin, to Jim Ochowicz and Sheila Young. After beginning her training in the Milwaukee area, she moved to Salt Lake City to continue training. She graduated from The Winter Sports School in Park City in fall 2002.

Ochowicz competed in the 2002, 2006 and 2010 Winter Olympics. As of 2010, she lived in Palo Alto, California.

Personal records

References

External links
 
 
 
 
 

1983 births
Living people
American female speed skaters
Speed skaters at the 2002 Winter Olympics
Speed skaters at the 2006 Winter Olympics
Speed skaters at the 2010 Winter Olympics
Olympic speed skaters of the United States
Sportspeople from the Milwaukee metropolitan area
Sportspeople from Waukesha, Wisconsin
21st-century American women